China–Thailand relations officially started in July 1975 after years of negotiations. For a long time, Thailand, formerly called Siam, had good relations with China. China was usually greatly respected in Siam and ensured the alliance of both countries. However, after Plaek Phibunsongkhram attempted to erase and prohibit Chinese culture and influence in the country, relations were seriously damaged.

A power struggle between the United States and China may be occurring because of the escalating presence of both in Thailand. China remains as an important ally to Thailand, partly because of its influence and prominence in the region.

History

Medieval and Early modern period 
Sino-Thai relations date back to as late as the early 15th century, when the Ming treasure voyages of Zheng He stopped in Ayutthaya Thailand. Despite the Chinese support of Malacca, a rival of Thailand, the Thai were still considered one of the more loyal Chinese tributaries; when Japan invaded Korea, the Thai offered to invade Japan for the Chinese. The relations between the two countries continued into the Qing period. In the 1760s, the Qing invasions of Burma alleviated the Burmese pressure on Thailand. Imports of Thai rice helped sustain the Qing Chinese population, while the Thai Chinese wielded significant influence over the political affairs of early modern Thailand.

Modern times 

Under Thai Prime Minister Plaek Phibunsongkhram, relations with the Chinese were tense during the Cold War. However, Phibunsongkhram sent the children of his advisor Sang Phathanothai to live in China as a goodwill gesture and for informal backdoor diplomacy. The book The Dragon's Pearl by Phathanothai's daughter Sirin recounts her experience in growing up during the Cultural Revolution in China.

In June 1963, Thai King Bhumibol and his wife, Sirikit, visited Taipei in the Republic of China (ROC). In 1969, Minister of National Defense Chiang Ching-kuo visited Bangkok as a special envoy of the government of the Republic of China to meet with Thai King. Thailand switched diplomatic relations from to the People's Republic of China in July 1975.

Until 1975, relations were of mutual suspicion, as the PRC supported left-leaning factions within the Thai political circle, and Thailand was wary of Chinese involvement with Cambodia's conflicts.

Relations developed positively in 1978, when China continued to back Thailand during Cambodia's internal conflict in which Marxist forces from Vietnam ousted the Maoist Khmer Rouge from power and threatened the security of Southeast Asia.

Relations continue to develop as trade became the dominant theme in bilateral relations. Thailand continues to support the One China Policy and maintains unofficial relations with Taiwan, which helps Thailand gain access to capital and the huge Chinese mainland market. Thai-Chinese businesses are part of the larger bamboo network. The Charoen Pokphand (CP Group), a prominent Thai conglomerate founded by the Thai-Chinese Chearavanont family, has been the single largest foreign investor in China.

In 1994, Taiwanese leader Lee Teng-hui made a private visit to Thailand and met with Thai King to discuss projects on economic co-operation.

Thai Princess Sirindhorn has received China's Medal of Friendship and Chinese Language and Culture Friendship Award for her work in promoting closer relations between the two countries. She speaks fluent Mandarin Chinese and has translated several Chinese novels into Thai.

Thailand adopted a policy of improving relations with China since the 2014 Thai coup d'état, when relations with the West worsened. In the Thai House of Representatives, concerns had been raised regarding increasing Chinese influence over the country, and some dubbed Thailand as a Chinese province, with the Chinese acquisition of land and real estate allowing China to build dams in the Mekong, and a Chinese private company to invest in the Thai high-speed rail megaproject.

Bilateral relations 

Bilateral trade relations grow each year. Chinese-Thai bilateral trade in 1999 was worth US$4.22 billion.
That reached $25.3 billion in 2006, US$31.07 billion in 2007, and US$36.2 billion in 2008. The 21st-century Chinese transformation into a major economic power has led to an increase of foreign investments in the bamboo network. The a network of overseas Chinese businesses operating in the markets of Southeast Asia shares family and cultural ties.

China's exports to Thailand computer components, electrical motors, consumer electronics, machinery, metal products, chemicals, and clothing.

Thailand's exports to China computer components, rubber, refined oil, plastic pellets, chemical electronics, crude oil, wood products, and food.

China is Thailand's second-largest export market. China is also Thailand's largest importer of goods into the country in 2010.

China and Thailand signed a Fmfree trade agreement 2003 that covered agricultural products. It was also known as an early harvest agreement on agricultural products. A comprehensive agreement is still being negotiated.

China plans to create China City Complex in Thailand to boost trade and to get around trade barriers in the ASEAN region as well as other large foreign markets. Thailand has trade agreements with the United States and the European Union.

China takes advantage of the ASEAN–China Free Trade Area, which came into effect January 1, 2010 and will allow its goods to be exported through ASEAN countries with zero or reduced trade barriers.

Military relations
Thai Prime Minister Prayuth Chan-ocha ordered 49 Chinese VT-4 main battle tanks and 3 submarines, which cost more than US$1 billion.

China and Thailand plan to open a joint commercial arms factory in Khon Kaen. It will be responsible for the assembly, production, and maintenance of land weapon systems for the Royal Thai Army. Specific details were subject to further discussions between the ministry and Norinco, which makes tanks, weapons, and other heavy equipment.

In May 2017, the Royal Thai Navy signed a contract with the China Shipbuilding Industry Corporation for a S26T diesel-electric submarine, which is derived from the Type 039A submarine. The submarine is expected to be delivered in 2023. Chinese Military Commentator Zhou Chenming stated that China will also likely provide technical guidance to Thailand.

See also 

ASEAN–China Free Trade Area
Thai Chinese
Bamboo network

Further reading

References

External links 
Chinese Embassy in Bangkok  
Thai Embassy in Beijing  

 
Thailand
Bilateral relations of Thailand